Miss Grand Nepal is an annual female beauty pageant in Nepal, founded in 2016 by a Kathmandu-based businessperson Sazum Katwal of Looks Entertainment, aiming to select the country representative to compete at its parent international pageant Miss Grand International. The license of the contest was later transferred to RK Entertainment Group and Izodom Nepal & Cosmo Group in 2017 and 2019, respectively. However, even lost the contest license in 2019, the RK group has held the Miss Grand national contest annually to select the delegates for other international contests since then. Currently, the contest licensed by the Thai-parent platform was managed by Suresh Tamang.

Since its first participation at Miss Grand International in 2013, to date, Nepali representatives have never won the contest. The reigning Miss Grand Nepal is Ronali Amatya of Kathmandu, who was appointed to the position by the Izodom group on 20 October 2021.

Background

History
Since the establishment of Miss Grand International in 2013, Nepal has always sent its representatives to participate, however, its first three representatives were appointed to the position without taking part in any respective national pageant. The first edition of Miss Grand Nepal happened after a Kathmandu-based event organizer Looks Entertainment Pvt. Ltd. (Mero Looks) had obtained the license in 2016, the contest was held at Hyatt Regency Hotel in Kathmandu on 23 August, featuring ten national finalists, of which Zeenus Lama was named the winner and expected to compete at Miss Grand International 2016 in Las Vegas, US. Nevertheless, the document problems and the short time for paper preparation caused her unable to obtain the visa and had withdrawn from the international competition. Later in 2017, she was appointed to participate in the following international edition in Vietnam, after Mero Looks lost the franchise to RK Entertainment Group, who owned the Miss Grand Nepal license from 2017 – 2018.

Under the management of RK Entertainment Group, several audition events were held in many cities countrywide, such as Nepalgunj, Butwal, Pokhara, Chitwan, Birganj, Biratnagar, Jhapa, and Kathmandu, to determine the finalists for the national contest. However, the RK group later lost the franchise to Bollywood Showdown Nepal Pvt. Ltd. of Izodom Nepal & Cosmo Group in 2019, but the former licesee organ still held the Miss Grand Nepal contest annually to select the country representatives for other several international pageants such as Miss Aura International, Miss Global International, Face of Beauty International, and Miss Landscape International, however, the pageant was renamed "Miss Grand Nepal World" in late 2022. Meanwhile the new licensee held the contest only twice in 2020 and 2022, the rest of their representatives were appointed.

Editions
The following list is the edition detail of the Miss Grand Nepal contest, since its inception in 2016.

Titleholder

Early era: Single organizer

Current era: Pageant redundancy

By RK Entertainment Group
In 2019, RK Entertainment Group lost the license of Miss Grand International in Nepal to Izodom Nepal and Cosmo Group, however, the organizer still held the Miss Grand national pageant annually to select country representatives for other international pageants such as Miss Grand World, Miss Landscape International, Face of Beauty International, Miss Aura International, etc.

By Izodom Nepal and Cosmo Group
The Izodom Nepal & Cosmo Group acquired the Miss Grand International license for Nepal in 2019, and held the national contest twice in 2020 and 2022, the rest of the country representatives at the international stage were appointed.

Winner gallery

Representatives at Miss Grand International

References

External links

 
 

Nepal
Beauty pageants in Nepal
Recurring events established in 2016
2016 establishments in Nepal